D'Arcy Christopher O'Connor (born 21 December 1994) is an English footballer. He joined Hyde from Rochdale where his contract was terminated by mutual consent in July 2014.

Career
Born in Oldham, O'Connor began his career with Rochdale and made his professional debut on 27 April 2013 in a 1–0 victory against Plymouth Argyle.

On 22 November 2013, he joined Conference Premier side Hyde on a one-month loan deal. He made his Hyde debut on 23 November, in a 2–1 defeat to Alfreton Town. He scored the first own goal  of his career in a 3–0 defeat to Macclesfield Town on 1 January 2014. His loan at Hyde was extended for a further month on 3 January 2014. On 24 March 2014, O'Connor joined Workington on loan for the remainder of the season.

After his release from Rochdale in July 2014, he signed for his former club Hyde in the Conference North. He left the club in January 2015. He then joined Ashton United.

Career statistics

Footnotes

A.  The "League" column constitutes appearances and goals (including those as a substitute) in the Football League and Football Conference.
B.  The "Other" column constitutes appearances and goals (including those as a substitute) in the Football League Trophy and FA Trophy.

References

External links

English footballers
English Football League players
Rochdale A.F.C. players
Hyde United F.C. players
Workington A.F.C. players
Living people
1994 births
Bacup Borough F.C. players
Ashton United F.C. players
Association football defenders